Saint-Sulpice is a municipality in Switzerland in the canton of Vaud, located in the district of Ouest Lausannois. It is a suburb of the city of Lausanne.

History
Saint-Sulpice is first mentioned in 1228 as Sanctus Surpiscius.

Geography

Of this area,  or 15.1% is used for agricultural purposes, while  or 7.0% is forested. Of the rest of the land,  or 75.8% is settled (buildings or roads).

Of the built up area, industrial buildings made up 6.5% of the total area while housing and buildings made up 41.9% and transportation infrastructure made up 11.8%.  Power and water infrastructure as well as other special developed areas made up 3.2% of the area while parks, green belts and sports fields made up 12.4%.  Out of the forested land, 5.4% of the total land area is heavily forested and 1.6% is covered with orchards or small clusters of trees.  Of the agricultural land, 13.4% is used for growing crops and 1.1% is pastures.

The municipality was part of the Morges District until it was dissolved on 31 August 2006, and Saint-Sulpice became part of the new district of Ouest Lausannois.

The municipality is located along Lake Geneva between the Venoge and Chamberonne river.  It consists of the village of Saint-Sulpice, the residential development of Les Pierrettes and the industrial zone of En Champigny.

Coat of arms
The blazon of the municipal coat of arms is Gules, Chief Argent, overall a Church Argent lined Sable.

Demographics

, 27.3% of the population are resident foreign nationals. Over the last 10 years (1999–2009 ) the population has changed at a rate of 4%. It has changed at a rate of 1.6% due to migration and at a rate of 3.1% due to births and deaths.

Most of the population speaks French (2,377 or 81.6%), with German being second most common (231 or 7.9%) and English being third (81 or 2.8%).  There are 58 people who speak Italian.

Of the population in the municipality 377 or about 12.9% were born in Saint-Sulpice and lived there in 2000.  There were 1,015 or 34.8% who were born in the same canton, while 610 or 20.9% were born somewhere else in Switzerland, and 849 or 29.1% were born outside of Switzerland.

In  there were 15 live births to Swiss citizens and 16 births to non-Swiss citizens, and in same time span there were 18 deaths of Swiss citizens and 1 non-Swiss citizen death.  Ignoring immigration and emigration, the population of Swiss citizens decreased by 3 while the foreign population increased by 15.  There were 4 Swiss men who immigrated back to Switzerland.  At the same time, there were 25 non-Swiss men and 46 non-Swiss women who immigrated from another country to Switzerland.  The total Swiss population change in 2008 (from all sources, including moves across municipal borders) was a decrease of 58 and the non-Swiss population increased by 67 people.  This represents a population growth rate of 0.3%.

The age distribution, in Saint-Sulpice is; 341 children or 11.3% of the population are between 0 and 9 years old and 228 teenagers or 7.5% are between 10 and 19.  Of the adult population, 264 people or 8.7% of the population are between 20 and 29 years old.  485 people or 16.0% are between 30 and 39, 419 people or 13.8% are between 40 and 49, and 451 people or 14.9% are between 50 and 59.  The senior population distribution is 440 people or 14.5% of the population are between 60 and 69 years old, 249 people or 8.2% are between 70 and 79, there are 133 people or 4.4% who are between 80 and 89, and there are 20 people or 0.7% who are 90 and older.

, there were 1,054 people who were single and never married in the municipality.  There were 1,491 married individuals, 146 widows or widowers and 223 individuals who are divorced.

, there were 1,329 private households in the municipality, and an average of 2.2 persons per household.  There were 451 households that consist of only one person and 44 households with five or more people.  Out of a total of 1,358 households that answered this question, 33.2% were households made up of just one person and there were 6 adults who lived with their parents.  Of the rest of the households, there are 424 married couples without children, 351 married couples with children  There were 63 single parents with a child or children.  There were 34 households that were made up of unrelated people and 29 households that were made up of some sort of institution or another collective housing.

 there were 351 single family homes (or 61.4% of the total) out of a total of 572 inhabited buildings.  There were 151 multi-family buildings (26.4%), along with 48 multi-purpose buildings that were mostly used for housing (8.4%) and 22 other use buildings (commercial or industrial) that also had some housing (3.8%).  Of the single family homes 26 were built before 1919, while 17 were built between 1990 and 2000.  The greatest number of single family homes (100) were built between 1946 and 1960.  The most multi-family homes (32) were built between 1971 and 1980 and the next most (30) were built between 1981 and 1990.  There were 12 multi-family houses built between 1996 and 2000.

 there were 1,410 apartments in the municipality.  The most common apartment size was 4 rooms of which there were 432.  There were 97 single room apartments and 358 apartments with five or more rooms.  Of these apartments, a total of 1,291 apartments (91.6% of the total) were permanently occupied, while 104 apartments (7.4%) were seasonally occupied and 15 apartments (1.1%) were empty.  , the construction rate of new housing units was 0 new units per 1000 residents.  The vacancy rate for the municipality, was 0.46%.

The historical population is given in the following chart:

Heritage sites of national significance

The Swiss Reformed Church of Sainte-Marie-Madeleine (Mary Magdalene) and Priory is listed as a Swiss heritage site of national significance (see the article about the Church in French).

The roof of the church was reconstructed after an arson on the morning of Thursday 19 July 2001.

Politics
In the 2007 federal election the most popular party was the SVP which received 27.57% of the vote.  The next three most popular parties were the FDP (16.05%), the SP (15.08%) and the Green Party (11.75%).  In the federal election, a total of 987 votes were cast, and the voter turnout was 52.3%.

Economy
, Saint-Sulpice had an unemployment rate of 3.8%.  , there were 2 people employed in the primary economic sector and about 2 businesses involved in this sector.  306 people were employed in the secondary sector and there were 27 businesses in this sector.  894 people were employed in the tertiary sector, with 151 businesses in this sector.  There were 1,528 residents of the municipality who were employed in some capacity, of which females made up 42.3% of the workforce.

 the total number of full-time equivalent jobs was 1,046. The number of jobs in the secondary sector was 290 of which 81 or (27.9%) were in manufacturing and 178 (61.4%) were in construction. The number of jobs in the tertiary sector was 755. In the tertiary sector; 269 or 35.6% were in wholesale or retail sales or the repair of motor vehicles, 15 or 2.0% were in the movement and storage of goods, 46 or 6.1% were in a hotel or restaurant, 88 or 11.7% were in the information industry, 20 or 2.6% were the insurance or financial industry, 93 or 12.3% were technical professionals or scientists, 12 or 1.6% were in education and 40 or 5.3% were in health care.

, there were 1,163 workers who commuted into the municipality and 1,250 workers who commuted away.  The municipality is a net exporter of workers, with about 1.1 workers leaving the municipality for every one entering.  About 2.7% of the workforce coming into Saint-Sulpice are coming from outside Switzerland.  Of the working population, 15.3% used public transportation to get to work, and 66.8% used a private car.

Religion

Of the rest of the population, there were 46 members of an Orthodox church (or about 1.58% of the population), there were 6 individuals (or about 0.21% of the population) who belonged to the Christian Catholic Church, and there were 81 individuals (or about 2.78% of the population) who belonged to another Christian church. There were 30 individuals (or about 1.03% of the population) who were Jewish, and 42 (or about 1.44% of the population) who were Islamic. There were 8 individuals who were Buddhist, 3 individuals who were Hindu and 9 individuals who belonged to another church.  456 (or about 15.65% of the population) belonged to no church, are agnostic or atheist, and 103 individuals (or about 3.53% of the population) did not answer the question.

Education
In Saint-Sulpice about 1,005 or (34.5%) of the population have completed non-mandatory upper secondary education, and 913 or (31.3%) have completed additional higher education (either university or a Fachhochschule).  Of the 913 who completed tertiary schooling, 46.5% were Swiss men, 25.1% were Swiss women, 17.5% were non-Swiss men and 10.8% were non-Swiss women.

In the 2009/2010 school year there were a total of 226 students in the Saint-Sulpice (VD) school district.  In the Vaud cantonal school system, two years of non-obligatory pre-school are provided by the political districts.  During the school year, the political district provided pre-school care for a total of 803 children of which 502 children (62.5%) received subsidized pre-school care.  The canton's primary school program requires students to attend for four years.  There were 138 students in the municipal primary school program.  The obligatory lower secondary school program lasts for six years and there were 87 students in those schools.  There were also 1 students who were home schooled or attended another non-traditional school.

, there were 24 students in Saint-Sulpice who came from another municipality, while 328 residents attended schools outside the municipality.

Adjacent to the municipality are the main campuses of École Polytechnique Fédérale de Lausanne and University of Lausanne.  Joint sports facilities and several student residences are located inside the St-Sulpice municipality.

Notable People

Among the known artists is Walter Weibel (1924-2006), whose sculptures prominently mark many public places in St-Sulpice, including Le Pélican (1976) on the Pelican Park, and 
Le Cri du Poète (1972) in the port.

References

Populated places on Lake Geneva